Serendipity 18 is an album by the Bob Florence Limited Edition that won the Grammy Award for Best Large Jazz Ensemble Album in 2000.

Track listing

Personnel
 Bob Florence – conductor, arranger, piano
 Don Shelton – alto and soprano saxophone, flute, clarinet
 Kim Richmond – alto saxophone, flute, clarinet
 Jeff Driskill – tenor saxophone, flute, clarinet
 Terry Harrington – tenor saxophone, flute, clarinet
 Bob Carr – baritone saxophone, contra-alto clarinet
 Bob Efford – baritone saxophone, bass clarinet
 Wayne Bergeron, Carl Saunders, Rick Baptist, George Graham, Steve Huffsteter, Ron Stout – trumpet
 Alex Iles – trombone
 Charlie Loper – trombone
 Bob McChesney – trombone
 Don Waldrop – bass trombone
 Trey Henry – bass
 Dick Weller – drums

Production
 Bob Florence – producer
 Douglas Evans – executive producer, associate producer
 Gene Czerwinski – executive producer
 Rusty Higgins – associate producer
 Don Murray – engineer
 Casey Stone, Dale Lanton, David Cee – assistant engineer
 Rich Breen – mixing, mastering
 Kirk Silsbee – liner notes

References

 
 
 

Jazz albums by American artists
Grammy Award for Best Large Jazz Ensemble Album
1999 albums
Big band albums